Jefferson Township is the northernmost township in Morris County, in the U.S. state of New Jersey. As of the 2020 United States census, the township's population was 20,538, a decrease of 776 (−3.6%) from the 2010 census count of 21,314, which in turn reflected an increase of 1,597 (+8.1%) from the 19,717 counted in the 2000 census.

Jefferson Township was formed as a township by an act of the New Jersey Legislature on February 11, 1804, from portions of Pequannock Township and Roxbury. The township was named after Thomas Jefferson, the President of the United States at the time the Township was created. The township is situated in the northernmost part of Morris County bordering both Passaic and Sussex counties.

Geography
According to the United States Census Bureau, the township had a total area of 42.77 square miles (110.78 km2), including 38.90 square miles (100.75 km2) of land and 3.88 square miles (10.04 km2) of water (9.06%).

The township borders Mount Arlington, Rockaway Township, Roxbury and Wharton in Morris County; West Milford in Passaic County; and Hardyston Township, Hopatcong and Sparta in Sussex County.

The township has two large divisions, Milton and Lake Hopatcong. Each half has its own first-aid squad, fire department substation and set of elementary schools. Addresses in the Milton section of the township are classified under the Oak Ridge mailing city, which is shared with a portion of West Milford, or in the Newfoundland mailing area, shared with a portion of West Milford and Rockaway Township. Addresses in Lake Hopatcong use either Lake Hopatcong (not to be confused with the Hopatcong mailing city used in the Borough of Hopatcong) or Wharton as their mailing city. In 2016, there was an effort to change the mailing address for the Lake Shawnee section of town from a Wharton, NJ 07885 ZIP code, to a Lake Hopatcong, NJ 07849 ZIP code. The effort was narrowly defeated. In 2026, a new effort will be made to change the mailing address ZIP code to Lake Hopatcong, NJ 07849. The Jefferson Township Municipal Building, Middle School, High School, Recycling Center and school bus depot are positioned at the boundary between the two halves of the township.

Unincorporated communities, localities and place names located partially or completely within the township include Berkshire Valley, Bowling Green Mountain, Cozy Lake, Espanong,  Halsey Island, Hurdtown, Lake Forest, Lake Hopatcong, Lake Swannanoa, Lake Shawnee, Lake Winona, Longwood Mountains, Lower Longwood, Minisink, Moosepac Pond, Newfoundland, Nolans Point, Oak Ridge, Petersburg, Prospect Point, Raccoon Island, Russia, Upper Longwood, Weldon, Woodport, White Rock, and Woodstock.

Portions of the township are owned by the City of Newark, Essex County, for its Pequannock River Watershed, which provides water to the city from an area of  that also includes portions of Hardyston Township, Kinnelon, Rockaway Township, Vernon Township, and West Milford.

Demographics

{{US Census population
| 1810= 1281
| 1820= 1231
| 1830= 1551
| 1840= 1412
| 1850= 1358
| 1860= 1471
| 1870= 1430
| 1880= 1792
| 1890= 1611
| 1900= 1341
| 1910= 1303
| 1920= 1226
| 1930= 1254
| 1940= 1548
| 1950= 2744
| 1960= 6884
| 1970=14122
| 1980=16413
| 1990=17825
| 2000=19717
| 2010=21314
| 2020=20538
| estimate=20495
| estyear=2021
| estref=
| footnote=Population sources:<small>1810–1920 18401850–1870<ref>Raum, John O. [https://books.google.com/books?id=5qZ4AAAAMAAJ&pg=PA256 The History of New Jersey: From Its Earliest Settlement to the Present Time, Volume 1], p. 256, J. E. Potter and company, 1877. Accessed December 18, 2012. "Jefferson contained in 1850 a population of 1,358; in 1860, 1,471; and in 1870, 1,430."</ref> 18501870 1880–18901890–1910 1910–19301900–1990 20002010 2020Total Population: Census 2010 - Census 2020 New Jersey Municipalities, New Jersey Department of Labor and Workforce Development. Accessed December 1, 2022.</small>
}}

2010 census

The Census Bureau's 2006–2010 American Community Survey showed that (in 2010 inflation-adjusted dollars) median household income was $92,095 (with a margin of error of +/− $6,923) and the median family income was $102,324 (+/− $6,788). Males had a median income of $73,152 (+/− $3,827) versus $51,933 (+/− $2,776) for females. The per capita income for the borough was $37,912 (+/− $1,795). About 2.6% of families and 3.5% of the population were below the poverty line, including 3.2% of those under age 18 and 4.2% of those age 65 or over.

2000 census
As of the 2000 United States census there were 19,717 people, 7,131 households, and 5,448 families residing in the township.  The population density was 485.3 people per square mile (187.4/km2).  There were 7,527 housing units at an average density of 185.2 per square mile (71.5/km2).  The racial makeup of the township was 96.14% White, 0.83% African American, 0.16% Native American, 1.07% Asian, 0.05% Pacific Islander, 0.62% from other races, and 1.14% from two or more races. Hispanic or Latino of any race were 3.41% of the population.DP-1: Profile of General Demographic Characteristics: 2000 - Census 2000 Summary File 1 (SF 1) 100-Percent Data for Jefferson township, Morris County, New Jersey , United States Census Bureau. Accessed August 7, 2012.

As of the 2000 Census, 25.7% of residents identified their ancestry as Italian, 22.9% Irish, 21.7% German, 11.6% English and 10.0% Polish.

There were 7,131 households, out of which 38.8% had children under the age of 18 living with them, 65.5% were married couples living together, 7.7% had a female householder with no husband present, and 23.6% were non-families. 18.5% of all households were made up of individuals, and 6.0% had someone living alone who was 65 years of age or older.  The average household size was 2.76 and the average family size was 3.17.

In the township the age distribution of the population shows 26.9% under the age of 18, 5.5% from 18 to 24, 33.8% from 25 to 44, 25.2% from 45 to 64, and 8.6% who were 65 years of age or older.  The median age was 37 years. For every 100 females, there were 98.3 males.  For every 100 females age 18 and over, there were 96.8 males.

The median income for a household in the township was $68,837, and the median income for a family was $76,974. Males had a median income of $51,359 versus $37,849 for females. The per capita income for the township was $27,950.  About 1.0% of families and 2.4% of the population were below the poverty line, including 2.2% of those under age 18 and 4.3% of those age 65 or over.

Arts and culture

Every year, the weekend following Independence Day, The Jefferson Arts Committee hosts a day of celebration known as Jefferson Township Day (it is colloquially referred to as "Jefferson Day"). Throughout the entire day, entertainment and festivities at the Jefferson Township High School are provided. Up until 2012 there would be a morning parade featuring the town's fire trucks, high school marching band and other local groups march down Weldon Road.  Starting in 2013 the parade has been substituted with various activities such as a fishing contest, kids kart race and a road bowling tournament.  There are a variety of activities set up on the Jefferson Township High School grounds for participants of Jefferson Day, including children's games, food and craft vendors, and performances at two stages. At night, the Jefferson Township Community Band, directed by Peter Tummillo Jr., performs before the display of fireworks. Township resident Bill Child wrote an original song in September 2006, "My Sweet Home Jefferson", that has since been sung at many Jefferson Day celebrations.

 Government 

 Local government 
Jefferson Township is governed under a Mayor-Council system of municipal government under the Faulkner Act. The township is one of 71 (of the 564) municipalities statewide that use this form of government. The governing body is comprised of the Mayor and the five-member Township Council. All governing body officials are elected at-large in partisan elections to serve four-year terms on a staggered basis in even-numbered years as part of the November general election, with three council seats up together for election and then two council seats and the mayoral seat coming up for election together two years later.

, the Mayor of Jefferson Township is Republican Eric Wilsusen, whose term of office ends December 31, 2026. Members of the Jefferson Township Council are Council President Melissa Senatore (R, 2026), Council Vice President Jay Dunham (R, 2024), Robert Birmingham (R, 2024), Josh Kalish (R, 2026) and H. Ronald Smith (R, 2024).2022 Municipal Data Sheet, Jefferson Township. Accessed February 3, 2023.Morris County Municipal Elected Officials For The Year 2020, Morris County, New Jersey Clerk, updated March 3, 2022. Accessed January 16,2023.General Election Winners For November 2, 2021, Morris County, New Jersey Clerk. Accessed January 1, 2022.

In March 2021, Josh Kalish was selected from a list of three candidates nominated by the Republican municipal committee to fill the council seat expiring in December 2022 that had been held by Debi Merz Bennett until she stepped down from office the previous month. Kalish served on an interim basis until the November 2021 general election, when he was elected to serve the balance of the term of office.Special Meeting Minutes for February 24, 2021, Jefferson Township. Accessed May 1, 2022. "Council President Senatore said Councilwoman Bennett had an announcement to make. Councilwoman Bennett said she would like to formally let her fellow council members and the administration know that she is retiring and resigning her position. She said she has spent over thirty (30) years of her life in an elected capacity and probably three quarters of her life in volunteer positions and is now moving on to another phase in her life. Councilwoman Bennett stated that her retirement would be effective as of February 28th of this month."

In May 2017, Michael J. Sanchelli resigned from his seat expiring in December 2018, after being mandated to leave office due to issues related to his state pension which require him to be out of office for 180 days.

In April 2016, the Township Council selected Kimberly Finnegan from three candidates nominated by the Republican municipal committee to fill the seat expiring in December 2016 that had been held by Richard W. Yocum until his resignation.

 Federal, state and county representation 
Jefferson Township is located in the 11th Congressional District and is part of New Jersey's 26th state legislative district.2019 New Jersey Citizen's Guide to Government, New Jersey League of Women Voters. Accessed October 30, 2019. Prior to the 2011 reapportionment following the 2010 Census, Jefferson Township had been in the 25th state legislative district.

 

Morris County is governed by a Board of County Commissioners comprised of seven members who are elected at-large in partisan elections to three-year terms on a staggered basis, with either one or three seats up for election each year as part of the November general election. Actual day-to-day operation of departments is supervised by County Administrator, John Bonanni. , Morris County's Commissioners are
Commissioner Director Tayfun Selen (R, Chatham Township, term as commissioner ends December 31, 2023; term as director ends 2022),
Commissioner Deputy Director John Krickus (R, Washington Township, term as commissioner ends 2024; term as deputy director ends 2022),
Douglas Cabana (R, Boonton Township, 2022), 
Kathryn A. DeFillippo (R, Roxbury, 2022),
Thomas J. Mastrangelo (R, Montville, 2022),
Stephen H. Shaw (R, Mountain Lakes, 2024) and
Deborah Smith (R, Denville, 2024).
The county's constitutional officers are the County Clerk and County Surrogate (both elected for five-year terms of office) and the County Sheriff (elected for a three-year term). , they are 
County Clerk Ann F. Grossi (R, Parsippany–Troy Hills, 2023),Clerks, Constitutional Officers Association of New Jersey. Accessed June 1, 2022.
Sheriff James M. Gannon (R, Boonton Township, 2022)Sheriffs, Constitutional Officers Association of New Jersey. Accessed June 1, 2022. and
Surrogate Heather Darling (R, Roxbury, 2024).Surrogates, Constitutional Officers Association of New Jersey. Accessed June 1, 2022.

Politics
As of March 2011, there were a total of 13,142 registered voters in Jefferson Township, of which 2,395 (18.2%) were registered as Democrats, 4,347 (33.1%) were registered as Republicans and 6,392 (48.6%) were registered as Unaffiliated. There were 8 voters registered as Libertarians or Greens.

In the 2012 presidential election, Republican Mitt Romney received 58.2% of the vote (5,370 cast), ahead of Democrat Barack Obama with 40.7% (3,757 votes), and other candidates with 1.0% (94 votes), among the 9,279 ballots cast by the township's 13,742 registered voters (58 ballots were spoiled), for a turnout of 67.5%. In the 2008 presidential election, Republican John McCain received 57.2% of the vote (6,040 cast), ahead of Democrat Barack Obama with 41.0% (4,335 votes) and other candidates with 1.1% (121 votes), among the 10,564 ballots cast by the township's 13,631 registered voters, for a turnout of 77.5%. In the 2004 presidential election, Republican George W. Bush received 61.9% of the vote (5,946 ballots cast), outpolling Democrat John Kerry with 36.9% (3,542 votes) and other candidates with 0.8% (97 votes), among the 9,605 ballots cast by the township's 12,847 registered voters, for a turnout percentage of 74.8.

In the 2013 gubernatorial election, Republican Chris Christie received 70.6% of the vote (4,043 cast), ahead of Democrat Barbara Buono with 27.9% (1,596 votes), and other candidates with 1.6% (89 votes), among the 5,789 ballots cast by the township's 13,715 registered voters (61 ballots were spoiled), for a turnout of 42.2%. In the 2009 gubernatorial election, Republican Chris Christie received 63.4% of the vote (4,270 ballots cast), ahead of  Democrat Jon Corzine with 26.8% (1,809 votes), Independent Chris Daggett with 8.5% (572 votes) and other candidates with 0.8% (56 votes), among the 6,738 ballots cast by the township's 13,397 registered voters, yielding a 50.3% turnout.

 Education 
The Jefferson Township Public Schools serve students in pre-kindergarten through twelfth grade. As of the 2018–19 school year, the district, comprised of seven schools, had an enrollment of 2,926 students and 267.5 classroom teachers (on an FTE basis), for a student–teacher ratio of 10.9:1. Schools in the district (with 2018–19 enrollment data from the National Center for Education Statistics) are 
Milton School with 175 students in grades Pre-K–K, 
Ellen T. Briggs School with 278 students in grades K–2, 
Cozy Lake School with 173 students in grades 1–2, 
Arthur T. Stanlick School with 280 students in grades 3–5, 
White Rock Elementary School with 325 students in grades 3–5, 
Jefferson Township Middle School with 728 students in grades 6–8 and 
Jefferson Township High School with 937 students in grades 9–12.New Jersey School Directory for the Jefferson Township Public Schools, New Jersey Department of Education. Accessed December 29, 2016.

Transportation

Roads and highways

A few major roads pass through Jefferson. Interstate 80 passes through very briefly in the southern tip without any interchanges; the closest exits are 33 and 34 in neighboring Wharton. State routes include Route 15 (part of the "Sparta Bypass") in the southwest, Route 23 in the northeast (as it straddles the Passaic County border) and Route 181 in the southwest. Green Pond Road, officially CR 513, is the only major county road that passes through for a short stretch in the northeast section.

Public transportation
NJ Transit had provided local bus service on the 967 and MCM7 routes, which was terminated in 2010 after subsidies to local route operators were eliminated as part of budget cuts.Private Carrier Bus Service reductions , NJ Transit. Accessed August 3, 2015.

Lakeland Bus Lines provides service along Interstate 80 operating between Newton and the Port Authority Bus Terminal in Midtown Manhattan.Morris County System Map , NJ Transit. Accessed August 7, 2015.

 Notable people 

People who were born in, residents of, or otherwise closely associated with Jefferson Township include:

 Derek Drymon (born 1968), former creative director on SpongeBob SquarePants''
 Mike Leach (born 1976), former tight end for the Denver Broncos, presently long snapper for the Arizona Cardinals
 Deonna Purrazzo (born 1994), professional wrestler for World Wrestling Entertainment
 Jerry Reese (born 1963), former General Manager of the New York Giants
 Jaren Sina (born 1994), professional basketball player, who played for Astoria Bydgoszcz of the Polish Basketball League

References

External links

Jefferson Township website
Jefferson Township Public Schools

School Data for the Jefferson Township Public Schools, National Center for Education Statistics
Jefferson Township STAR Project
Abandoned Mines of Jefferson, New Jersey
Jefferson Highlights Summer Concert Series at Camp Jefferson AmphiTheater

 
1804 establishments in New Jersey
Faulkner Act (mayor–council)
Populated places established in 1804
Townships in Morris County, New Jersey